The 1953 Roller Hockey World Cup was the ninth roller hockey world cup, organized by the Fédération Internationale de Patinage a Roulettes (now under the name of Fédération Internationale de Roller Sports). It was contested by 13 national teams (11 from Europe, 1 from Africa and for the first time, 1 from South America) and it is also considered the 1953 European Roller Hockey Championship (despite the presences of Egypt and Brazil). All the games were played in the city of Geneva, in Switzerland, the chosen city to host the World Cup. Also for the first time there was a two-group stage, with the first two teams from each group qualifying to a final-four group.

Group stage

Group A

Group B

Final phase

4th to 12th play-offs
 11th place play-off

 9th place play-off

 7th place play-off

 5th place play-off

 France classified in 9th place, by greater goal average in the group phase.

Final-four

Standings

See also
FIRS Roller Hockey World Cup
CERH European Roller Hockey Championship

External links
1953 World Cup in rink-hockey.net historical database

Roller Hockey World Cup
International roller hockey competitions hosted by Switzerland
1953 in Swiss sport
1953 in roller hockey